The island worm snake (Typhlops sulcatus) is a species of snake in the Typhlopidae family.

Geographic range
It is endemic to southwestern Hispaniola (Dominican Republic and Haiti), formerly including Navassa Island, an uninhabited island located in the Caribbean.

Conservation status
It has been rated Near Threatened. It is extirpated from Navassa Island, where the species became a casualty of human interference and feral predators, such as rodents, cats, dogs and goats that were introduced during the large-scale mining period on this small island during the 1800s.

References

Typhlops
Reptiles described in 1868
Reptiles of the Dominican Republic
Reptiles of Haiti
Endemic fauna of Hispaniola